Tunbridge Wells Girls' Grammar School (TWGGS), established in 1905, is an all-female selective school in Royal Tunbridge Wells, a town in Kent, England.  The "eleven plus" examination represents the main entrance criterion, along with residence within the catchment area (1.6 miles as of 2015) A small number of spaces are reserved for students outside the catchment area, which are called governess places. These are generally only given to students with high marks in the 11+. The current head mistress is Mrs Linda Wybar.

About the school
The school is a specialist school in Music with English. The school has taken part in many sporting events such as football, curling, hockey, netball and dance. There are 5 forms per year named 'T', 'W', 'I', 'G' and 'S', and each class has around 30 pupils.

Notable former pupils

Ellie Beaven, actress
Jo Brand, stand-up comedian
Nazaneen Ghaffar, television weather presenter
Rosalind Maskell, microbiologist
Ellie Miles, rugby player
Virginia Wade, tennis player

See also 
Tonbridge Grammar School
Tunbridge Wells Boys' Grammar School
The Skinners' School
The Judd School
Weald of Kent Grammar School
The Skinners’ Kent Academy

References

External links 
 
 Ofsted Site
 Results of Latest Ofsted Inspection
 Key Stage 3 Achievement and Attainment Tables 2006
 GCSE Achievement and Attainment Tables 2006

Grammar schools in Kent
Girls' schools in Kent
Schools in Royal Tunbridge Wells
Educational institutions established in 1905
1905 establishments in England
Foundation schools in Kent